The Columbus Public Carnegie Library is a Carnegie library located at 205 N. Kansas in Columbus, Kansas. The library was built in 1913 through a $10,000 grant from the Carnegie foundation. George P. Washburn & Son designed the building in the Classical Revival style. The red brick building's facade is made up of three bays. The building's entrance pavilion features a wooden entablature reading "PUBLIC LIBRARY"; the entablature encircles the building. The doorway is topped by a glass transom with a triangular pattern and a limestone lintel.

The library was added to the National Register of Historic Places on June 25, 1987.

References

External links

Libraries on the National Register of Historic Places in Kansas
Neoclassical architecture in Kansas
Library buildings completed in 1913
Buildings and structures in Cherokee County, Kansas
Carnegie libraries in Kansas
1913 establishments in Kansas
National Register of Historic Places in Cherokee County, Kansas